Bulungu is an extinct genus of bandicoot-like mammal from Oligo-Miocene deposits of Riversleigh, northwestern Queensland, and the Etadunna Formation, Australia. It was first named by Gurovich et al. (2013) and the type species is Bulungu palara.
Two additional species, Bulungu campbelli adnd Bulungu minkinaensis, were also described in 2013. Bulungu muirheadae is the oldest fossil bandicoot recovered to date.  An additional three species Bulungu minkinaensis, Bulungu pinpaensis, and Bulungu westermani were named by Travouillon, Beck & Case (2021) allowing for placement of the genus in the superfamily Yaraloidea.

References 

Peramelemorphs
Oligocene marsupials
Prehistoric mammals of Australia
Miocene marsupials
Fossil taxa described in 2013
Riversleigh fauna
Prehistoric marsupial genera